A police custody and security officer, popularly known as a turnkey, is a uniformed non-warranted officer of a Scottish police force. Pay starts from £20,445 and additional extras are added for shift work and weekend working.

Powers
They have powers to:
 transfer people in custody from any court, prison, police station or mental hospital to another
 have custody of persons held in legal custody on court premises (whether or not such persons would otherwise be in the custody of the court) and to produce them before the court
have custody of persons temporarily held in legal custody in relevant premises (any court, prison, police station or hospital) while in the course of transfer from one set of such premises to another
 apprehend people who have escaped from any court, prison, police station or hospital or whilst being transferred between those places
remove from relevant premises any person—
 who they have reasonable grounds to believe has committed or is committing an offence, or
 who is causing a disturbance or nuisance
search any person who is in custody or is unlawfully at large, anywhere
in relevant premises, or in any other place in which a person in his custody who is being transferred from one set of relevant premises to another is present, to search (any or all)—
property;
any person who he has reasonable grounds to believe has committed or is committing an offence;
any person who is seeking access to a person in the officer’s custody or to relevant premises;
in relevant premises, or in any other place in which a person in legal custody is or may be, to require any person who he has reasonable grounds for suspecting has committed or is committing an offence to give his name and address and either—
to remain there with the officer until the arrival of a constable; or
where reasonable in all the circumstances, to go with the officer to the nearest police station, but only if before imposing any such requirement on a person the officer informs him of the nature of the suspected offence and of the reason for the requirement
at a constable’s direction, photograph, or take relevant physical data from, any person held in custody
to use reasonable force (which may include the use of handcuffs and other means of restraint) where necessary in exercising the above powers

Additional duties
They also have duties to:

attend to the well-being of persons in their custody
prevent the escape of such persons from their custody
prevent, or detect and report on, the commission or attempted commission by such persons of other unlawful acts
act with a view to preserving good order in the premises of any court and in land connected with such premises
ensure good order and discipline on the part of such persons (whether or not in the premises of any court or in land connected with such premises)
in fulfilment of this duty, apprehend any person and to detain that person in custody in the premises of the court in question;
give effect to any order of a court.

It is an offence to assault or impersonate an officer.

References

Law enforcement occupations in the United Kingdom